The  was a Japanese freight only railway line between Harutori and Shireto, all within Kushiro, Hokkaidō. The line was the only private railway in Hokkaidō, as well as the only surviving colliery railway in Japan. The first section of the line opened in 1925. It also had a passenger service until 1966. The line transported coals from the mine to Port of Kushiro until its closure in 2019.

Basic data
Distance: 4 km
Gauge: 1,067 mm
Stations: 2
Track: single
Traction: internal combustion (diesel)

History

The Pacific Ocean Coal Co. opened a 6 km line from the coal mine at Harutori to Irifune-cho wharf in 1925/27, with a 3 km line connecting the mine to Higashi-Kushiro opening in 1928.
 
The line was truncated 2 km in 1966 when a new coal loading wharf opened, the passenger service ceasing at the same time.

The Pacific Ocean Coal Co. merged with Taiheiyō Coal Services and Transportation Co. in 1979.

The Higashi-Kushiro - Harutori section closed in 1986, with the remaining section continuing to operate.

Operations on the line ceased in March 2019. A farewell run was operated on April 6, 2019. The line closed in June 2019.

See also
List of railway companies in Japan
List of railway lines in Japan

References

External links

 

Railway lines in Japan
Rail transport in Hokkaido
Railway lines opened in 1925